This list includes the tallest buildings in Ahmedabad City limits. It does not include those in Gandhinagar or GIFT City, even though some may claim they are part of the same urban agglomeration.

Tallest buildings
This lists ranks buildings in Ahmedabad that stand at least  based on standard height measurement. This includes spires and architectural details but does not include antenna masts. Only completed buildings and under-construction buildings that have been topped out are included.

See also 
 List of tallest buildings in India
 List of tallest buildings in different cities in India

References

Ahmedabad
Buildings